The 2015–16 Canisius Golden Griffins men's basketball team represented Canisius College during the 2015–16 NCAA Division I men's basketball season. The Golden Griffins, led by fourth year head coach Jim Baron, played their home games at the Koessler Athletic Center and were members of the Metro Atlantic Athletic Conference. They finished the season 14–19, 8–12 in MAAC play to finish in a tie for seventh place. They defeated Niagara in the first round of the MAAC tournament to advance the quarterfinals where they lost to Iona.

On May 20, head coach Jim Baron announced his retirement. He finished at Canisius with a four year record of 73–59.

Roster

Schedule

|-
!colspan=9 style="background:#0B2548; color:#EAAB20;"| Exhibition

|-
!colspan=9 style="background:#0B2548; color:#EAAB20;"| Regular season

|-
!colspan=9 style="background:#0B2548; color:#EAAB20;"| MAAC tournament

References

Canisius Golden Griffins men's basketball seasons
Canisius